Gary Myers (born 22 July 1941 at Wiluna, Western Australia) is a model and actor, best known as the original "Milk Tray Man" in the long-running television advertising campaign for the Cadbury chocolates that ran from 1968 until 1984. His other notable role was that of Captain Lew Waterman in Gerry Anderson's cult TV series, UFO.

References

External links
 Gary Myers at the Internet Movie Database

British male television actors
Living people
1941 births